Francisco Cabañas Pardo (22 January 1912 – 26 January 2002) was a Mexican boxer. He competed in the flyweight class during the 1932 Summer Olympics and, although he lost the final against Hungarian István Énekes, he became the first Mexican athlete to ever win an individual Olympic medal.

1932 Olympic results
Below are the results of Francisco Cabanas, a flyweight boxer from Mexico, who competed at the 1932 Olympic boxing tournament in Los Angeles:

 Round of 16: bye
 Quarterfinal: defeated Ivan Duke (South Africa) on points
 Semifinal: defeated Thomas Pardoe (Great Britain) on points
 Final: lost to István Énekes (Hungary) on points (was awarded the silver medal)

References

1912 births
2002 deaths
Flyweight boxers
Boxers from Mexico City
Boxers at the 1932 Summer Olympics
Olympic boxers of Mexico
Olympic silver medalists for Mexico
Olympic medalists in boxing
Mexican male boxers
Medalists at the 1932 Summer Olympics
20th-century Mexican people
21st-century Mexican people